The Liaison agency Flanders-Europe or vleva was set up by the Flemish Government on 22 July 2005 to enhance the Flemish presence at the European level and to promote of Flemish interests in Europe.

External links
 Official website of vleva

Flemish government departments and agencies